Stoke College in Stoke-by-Clare, near Haverhill, Suffolk, England, is a co-educational day school for children aged 11 to 18, with boarding for children aged 11 to 18. It is built on the site of a major medieval monastic college.

History of the site 
The college traces its name back to 1415, when a college for priests was founded on the site. The medieval College had been founded on the earlier site of a Benedictine priory, originally located in Clare Castle, but moved to Stoke-by-Clare in 1124. Under the patronage of the powerful de Clare family, it was one of the wealthiest monastic houses in Norman England, until a disastrous fire in the 1390s. The college annexed Chipley Priory in about 1468.

In 1534 Dr Walter Haddon, writing in a letter from Cambridge, says of the college "how that place seemed in a manner to be made on purpose for scholars, both to learn themselves, and to teach others: and that its situation was such that above all others it is best suited for honest and ingenious pleasures." The last Dean was Matthew Parker, future Archbishop of Canterbury under Elizabeth I, and a founder of the Church of England.

The buildings had been abandoned after the Dissolution of the monasteries in the 1540s; the site was bought by the Elwes family around 1660, who created the surviving main house and stables. The Elweses did not always keep the premises in fine style – one member of the family, John Elwes was so mean that he served as Dickens's model for Ebenezer Scrooge in A Christmas Carol.

In 1897 the estate was bought by Henry Loch, 1st Baron Loch, a Victorian army officer and colonial administrator. He brought in his wife's nephew, the noted architect Edwin Lutyens, to add a wing in his distinctive Arts and Crafts style, as well as gardens in the style of his friend and co-designer Gertrude Jekyll. The Lochs struggled to keep up the estate during and after World War Two; in 1950 they abandoned the house.

In 1954 it became a small independent school, reviving the historic name "Stoke College" a few years later. It now serves around 200 pupils.

In 1961 the house became a Grade II* listed building.

Recent history 
'Grenville' was the name chosen for the small school which was founded in Clare a little over 50 years ago. It existed in the building known as 'The Norfolks' for a while before being acquired by Miss Elliot and Miss McLoad, who had previously been senior lecturers, training teachers at Bingley College in Yorkshire, in 1951. They became joint Principals.

This school was so successful that it quickly grew in size and new premises had to be found. The house recently vacated by the Loch family proved ideal and the school moved in 1954. In 1969, Miss Elliot retired and Martin Gedney became the first Headmaster of Stoke College. This was a time of great change and in 1973 it was decided that the name of the school should be changed to Stoke College.

Notable alumni 
 Matt Cardle, singer and songwriter; winner of "The X Factor" in 2010

References

External links
Official website

Educational institutions established in 1951
Private schools in Suffolk
Boarding schools in Suffolk
Preparatory schools in Suffolk
Grade II* listed buildings in Suffolk
Grade II* listed educational buildings
Works of Edwin Lutyens in England
1951 establishments in England